Zaher el-Khatib is a Lebanese Sunni politician.

Early life and education
He was born in 1940. He obtained a Bachelor of Law degree from the Lebanese University. As of 2018, he served as General Secretary of the Toilers League.

Political career
El-Khatib was elected to parliament in the 1971 Chouf parliamentary by-election, after the death of his father Anwar el-Khatib (the incumbent Sunni parliamentarian from Chouf). He was reelected to parliament in the 1971, 1992, 1996 and 2000 elections. He was one of two Lebanese parliamentarians to vote against the 1983 May 17 Agreement.

He served as Minister of State for Administrative Reform between December 24, 1990 and May 16, 1992, in the cabinet of Omar Karami.

As of 2018 el-Khatib served as chairman of the Lebanese Committee for Support to the Reunification of Korea.

See also
Amal Movement
Lebanese Civil War
Mountain War (Lebanon)
Toilers League

References

External links
 Anwar El-Khatib (1910-1970)-A sorely missed jurist.

1940 births
Members of the Parliament of Lebanon
Living people
Lebanese Sunni Muslims